Menagh Military Air Base (or Minnigh airport, Minakh Air Base) is a Syrian Air Force installation located  south of Azaz, Aleppo Governorate, Syria near the village of Manaq.

Menagh Air Base was home to the 4th Flying Training Squadron, equipped with MBB 223 Flamingo trainer aircraft and Mil Mi-8 helicopters.

Syrian Civil War
The air base became a major target of the armed opposition in the Syrian Civil War's Battle of Aleppo. The air base was under siege by opposition forces from August 2012 until it fell to the rebels and Islamists (including ISIL, the Northern Storm Brigade and Tawhid Brigades) on 6 August 2013. It subsequently fell under control of the Al Nusra Front. On 10 February 2016, the Syrian Democratic Forces from nearby Afrin captured the airbase, aided by Russian airstrikes.

See also
 List of Syrian Air Force bases

References

Syrian Air Force bases
Military installations of Syria